The tiqin is a name applied to several two-stringed Chinese bowed string musical instruments in the huqin family of instruments.

Types
There are several types of tiqin:

The tiqin used for kunqu opera
The tiqin used for Cantonese music
The tiqin used in Fujian and Taiwan
An antiquated name for the sihu

Overview
The tiqin used in Cantonese music, also known as the zhutiqin (竹提琴) is a member of the "hard bow" (硬弓) ensemble in Cantonese opera. Its neck is made of hardwood, often suanzhi (酸枝, rosewood) or zitan (紫檀, red sandalwood). The zhutiqin'''s sound chamber is made of a very large section of bamboo (larger than that of the erxian, another bowed string instrument used in Cantonese music). Instead of snakeskin, the face is made of a piece of tong wood (桐, Firmiana simplex) or palm wood (like the face of a yehu). The back of the sound chamber is made of the natural joint in bamboo, with sound holes cut in it. The tiqin used today in Cantonese opera is tuned to 仜-士/mi-la/E-a (the opposite of the erxian, which is tuned A-e.)

The name also occasionally referred to what is now called the sihu.

Additionally, the term tiqin is used in Chinese as a generic term referring to Western bowed string instruments of the violin family:Xiao tiqin = violinZhong tiqin = violaDa tiqin = celloDiyin tiqin'' = double bass

See also
Huqin
Erhu
 Chinese music
 List of Chinese musical instruments

External links
Tiqin page

Chinese musical instruments
Necked bowl lutes
Huqin family instruments
Bowed instruments
Drumhead lutes
Continuous pitch instruments

zh:提琴